Wahb ibn Munabbih was a Yemenite Muslim traditionist of Dhimar (two days' journey from Sana'a) in Yemen; died at the age of ninety, in a year variously given by Arabic authorities as 725, 728, 732, and 737 C.E. He was a member of Banu Alahrar (Sons of the free people), a Yemeni of Persian origin. He is counted among the Tabi‘in and a narrator of Isra'iliyat.

Biography

Wahb's father, Munabbih ibn Kamil, had been a convert to Islam and a companion of Muhammad. Wahb himself had turned from Judaism to Islam, according to Al-Tibr al-Masluk (ed. 1306 A.H., p. 41). Other biographers such as Al-Nawawi and Ibn Khallikan, did not write that he was Jewish. The fact that he was well versed in the Isra'iliyyat, on which he wrote much, probably gave rise to the statement that he was Jewish, although he might have acquired his knowledge from his teacher Ibn 'Abbas.

Wahb was made a judge during the reign of Umar ibn Abd al-Aziz.

He died at the age of ninety, in a year variously given by Arabic authorities as 725, 728, 732, and 737 CE, sources placing for instance his death in San'aa in 110 AH (728/8 CE) at the beginning of the reign of Hisham ibn Abd al-Malik, or in 114 AH (732/3 CE). Yaqut agreed with the latter in his book, Mu’jamul-Udabaa.

His full name is given as "Abu 'Abd Allah al-Ṣana'ani al-Dhimari", or Wahb ibn Munabbih ibn Kamil ibn Sirajud-Din Dhee Kibaar Abu-Abdullah al-Yamani al-San'ani.

Family
On his father's side he was descended from Persian knights, known as al-Abna', while his mother was a Himyarite.

Wahb also had a brother named Hammam ibn Munabbih, who is reported to have written 138 Hadiths in his Sahifa.

Legacy
Wahb is said to have read more than seventy books on the prophets, and he was an extremely prolific narrator ("rawi") of stories regarding Mohammed and Biblical personages. He had a son named Abdallah al-Abnawi.

Works
Among Wahb's many writings may be mentioned his "Qiṣaṣ al-Anbiya'" ("Story of the Prophets") and "Kitab al-Isra'iliyat" ("Book of the Israelites", "Ḥajji Khalfa", iv. 518, v. 40). The former, which is believed to be his earliest literary work, is, as its title indicates, a collection of narratives concerning Biblical personages, the accounts being drawn from Jewish folk-lore though presented in Islamitic guise. Thus, like Ibn 'Abbas and Kaʽb al-Aḥbār, he was an authority for many legends narrated by Al-Ṭabari, Mas'udi, and others. The "Kitab al-Isra'iliyat", or "Book of Jewish Matters", is lost, but was apparently a collection of Jewish stories, many of them incorporated by a Jewish compiler into the "Arabian Nights". In the latter collection there are indeed many stories that bear the Jewish stamp, and some of them, such as the "Angel of Death", are ascribed to Wahb by the author of "Al-Tibr al-Masluk". There are also other stories which are attributed to Wahb, and many more which, from their Jewish character, may be traced to him. His Jewish learning may be illustrated by his opinion of the Shekinah (Arabic, "Sakinah") as stated by different Arabic authors.

According to Al-Baghawi in his "Ma'alim al-Tanzil" (Ignác Goldziher, "Abhandlungen zur Arabischen Philologie", i. 182, Leyden, 1896), Wahb believed that the Shekinah was the spirit of God. On the other hand, Al-ḥabari ("Annals", i. 544), in recording the fact that the Israelites sometimes took the Ark of the Covenant into battle when they were at war with their enemies (comp. ), quotes Wahb as saying in the name of a certain Jewish authority that the Shekinah which rested in the Ark was a being in the shape of a cat, and that when the Israelites heard the mewing of cats coming from the interior of the Ark, they were sure of a victory.

Hadith
He narrated hadith from:
Anas ibn Malik 
Jabir ibn Abd-Allah
`Abd Allah ibn `Abbas
Abd-Allah ibn Umar
Abu Hurairah
Abu-Sa'id al-Khudri
Tawoos ibn Kaysaan
Amr ibn Dinar
Amr ibn Shayb
Hammam ibn Munabbih
others

Students and intellectual heirs
F. Perles, in a series of papers contributed to "Monatsschrift" (xxii.), has pointed out that several of the stories of the "Arabian Nights"—mainly those taken from the Cairene additions—deal with Jewish topics or are derived from Jewish sources. V. Chauvin, in a special treatise on the Egyptian recension of "One Thousand and One Nights" (Brussels, 1899), has suggested that these Jewish tales and others were introduced by one of the last redactors, a converted Jew, probably the author of the "Story of a Man of Jerusalem," sometimes attributed to Abraham, son of Maimonides. The Jew-ish tales themselves are probably extracted from a work of a Jewish convert to Islam, Wahb ibn Munabbih (638-738), entitled "Jewish Matters."

The following are the tales of the "Arabian Nights" that appear from several investigations to be from Jewish sources. The numbers are those in W. F. Kirby's comparative list given in all forms of Burton's edition; the letters in parentheses refer to the identifications by Perles:
22. Ala Al-Din Abu Al-Shamat.
41. Ali Shah and Zumurrud.
52. Devout Israelite (F.).
114. Angel of Death and the Proud King.

115. Angel of Death and the Rich King.

116. Angel of Death and the King of the Children of Israel.

117. Izkander (Alexander the Great) and the Poor Folk.

119. The Jewish Cadi and His Pious Wife (A.)

122. Devout Tray-Maker and His Wife (J.).

126. The Moslem Champion.

127. The Christian King's Daughter.

128. Prophet and Providence (C.).

130. Island King and Pious Israelite.

132. Queen of Serpents: (a) Adventures of Bulukuia; (b) Story of Jamshah.

133 gg. The Seventh Voyage of Sindbad.

136. Judar and His Brethren.

137. Ajib and Gharib.

155. Hassan of Bassorah.

161 k. The Blind Man and the Cripple (G.).

163. Abdallah the Fisherman.

168. Abdallah ibn Fazil and His Brothers.

183 a. Harun al-Rashid and TuḦfat al-Ḳulub.

196. Story of Ali Cogia (K.—one of Galland's additions).

203. Sultan of Yemen and His Three Sons.

256. Story of Abdallah (E.).

Besides these stories, there are several others obviously inserted by the same hand. Thus, the whole collection from 114 to 132 appears to be by the hand of Wahb ibn Munabbih.

Sunni view
Although Muslims regarded him as a reliable authority in these accounts, many of them, such as Ibn Khaldun, declared that in his other writings he simply lied (comp. "Notices et Extraits des Manuscrits," xx.part 1, p. 461; De Slane, Ibn Challikan, iii. 673, note 2).

It is known that Wahb and Ka'b al-Ahbar taught Tafsir their fellow Muslims. Scholars like Abd Allah ibn Mas'ud had warned people not to learn the Tafsir from the People of the Book, arguing that they used to interpolate their own biblical beliefs, teachings and history with the Islamic creeds and preaching.

Ahmad ibn Hanbal said "he was a man of Persian descent" and also "Anyone from Yemen and has a 'Dhee' in his name, then his lineage is noble. It is said: So and so has Dhee and so and so has no Dhee."

Al-'Ijlee said: "He was a trustworthy Taabi'ee, and the judge over San'aa" 

 said:

See also 

Wahb (name)

References

7th-century births
7th-century Iranian people
8th-century deaths
8th-century historians of the medieval Islamic world
8th-century Iranian people
8th-century writers
Converts to Islam
Isra'iliyyat narrators
Tabi‘un
Tabi‘un hadith narrators
Yemenite people of Iranian descent